Origins of a Story: 202 True Inspirations Behind the World's Greatest Literature  is a 2017 non-fiction book by Jake Grogan. It is about authors' inspirations for well known stories, including inspirations of Stephen King, Dr. Seuss, Lewis Carroll, and more.

Reception
A review from Kirkus Reviews concluded with, "A lively peek into literary genius". Matt Sutherland of Foreword Reviews wrote, "If you’ve wondered how your favorite masterpieces got their starts, the itch can now be scratched". The book was a 2017 INDIES finalist on Foreword Magazine.

References

External links
Jake Grogan on a Popzara podcast about the book

2017 non-fiction books
American non-fiction books